Origo is the second extended play by Polish singer and songwriter Natalia Nykiel, released 15 November 2019 through Universal Music Polska.

Track listing 
Sampling credits

 "Volcano" samples the song "Careful" by Paramore from their 2009 album Brand New Eyes.

Charts

Release history

References 

2019 EPs